Walter Allen Jenkins (1 April 1891 – 26 September 1958) was an English academic. He served as the 7th vice-chancellor of the University of Dhaka during 1953–1956.

Education
Jenkins graduated from Emmanuel College in London. Later he obtained a D.Sc. degree from Sheffield University in 1925 and Legum Doctor degree from Cambridge University.

Career

Jenkins started his career at the Indian Education Service in 1916. He then served as a professor of physics at Dhaka College. In 1921, he joined University of Dhaka as a professor and head of the Department of Physics. In 1926, he was appointed as a Special Officer to the Government of Bengal and he acted as the divisional inspector of schools in Chittagong until 1933.

Jenkins served as the secretary to the Government of Bengal during 1945–47.

Jenkins was the first registrar of the University College of North Staffordshire (later became Keele University) during 1949–1953. In November 1953, he joined the University of Dhaka as the vice-chancellor.

References

1891 births
1958 deaths
Alumni of the University of Sheffield
Alumni of the University of Cambridge
British expatriate academics in Pakistan
Academic staff of Dhaka College
Academic staff of the University of Dhaka
Vice-Chancellors of the University of Dhaka